Amos Adolphus Ford (5 November 1916 – 28 March 2015) was a forester from British Honduras, now Belize, who was one of a group of 150 that crossed the Atlantic to travel to Scotland during the Second World War. Ford later documented his experiences in two books and became a British civil servant.

Amos Adolphus Ford was born in Belize City, one of 11 children. After Honduran Forestry Unit In Scotland was disbanded, he moved to Newcastle upon Tyne to work with Newcastle Breweries.

Publications
Telling The Truth: The Life And Times Of The British Honduran Forestry Unit In Scotland (1941-44). London: Karia Press, 1985. 
Recollections. 1989.

References

External links 
Nia Reynolds, "Ex-Serviceman Spent Years Defending 'Defamed' Black Unit", The Voice, 14 May 2015.
"Deceased Estates", The Gazette.

1916 births
2015 deaths
British foresters
People from Belize City
British civil servants
20th-century British male writers
Belizean emigrants to the United Kingdom